Lukas Tursch (born 29 March 1996) is an Austrian footballer who plays as a defensive midfielder or centre back for Blau-Weiß Linz.

Career

Blau-Weiß Linz
On 15 June 2018, Tursch joined FC Blau-Weiß Linz on a two-year deal.

On 24 June 2022, Tursch came back to FC Blau-Weiß Linz on a two-year deal.

SKN St. Pölten
On 8 February 2021, he moved to SKN St. Pölten.

References

External links

1996 births
Living people
Austrian footballers
Austria youth international footballers
Association football defenders
SC Austria Lustenau players
SV Horn players
Floridsdorfer AC players
FC Blau-Weiß Linz players
SKN St. Pölten players
2. Liga (Austria) players
Austrian Regionalliga players